Ghorak is a village in the center of the Ghorak District in Kandahar Province, Afghanistan.

See also
Kandahar Province

References

External links

Populated places in Kandahar Province